Montecocha (possibly from local Quechua munti tree; forest, Quechua qucha lake, "tree lake" or "forest lake") is a mountain in the Andes of Peru, about  high. It is located in the Lima Region, Cajatambo Province, Cajatambo District. Montecocha lies south of the Huayhuash mountain range, southwest of Millpo and east of a mountain named Shahuanacocha.

References

Mountains of Peru
Mountains of Lima Region